Tony Sithembiso Yengeni (born 11 October 1954) is a South African politician. He was an anti-Apartheid activist and joined the African National Congress (ANC) in 1976 and later its armed wing, Umkhonto we Sizwe. From 1994 until 2003 he served as member of the South African parliament for the ruling ANC party, including service as their Chief Whip. In 2003, he was found guilty of fraud in a case linked to the corruption investigation into an arms deal, but he remained an ANC party stalwart. In 2018, he was made the chairperson of the ANC's crime and corruption committee. He was sentenced to four years in prison, but only served four months, for getting an unlawful discount on a Mercedes Benz he purchased.

Yengeni was disqualified from standing for nomination as a candidate for a position in the National Executive Committee (NEC) in 2022 as a result of having been found guilty of fraud.

ANC Government
After apartheid ended, Yengeni assumed the post of secretary general of the ANC in the Western Cape. He was elected to Parliament in 1994 and served there until he resigned in March 2003, after his fraud conviction. While in Parliament, he chaired the Joint Standing Committee for Defence of the Parliament of South Africa. Then Yengeni was elected as Chief Whip of the ANC in Parliament.

He was elected to the ANC's 80-member National Executive Committee in December 2007 in 21st place, with 2,032 votes.

Zuma case

Yengeni was arrested in October 2001 and released on bail of R10 000 during an investigation by then National Director of Public Prosecutions, Bulelani Ngcuka, into allegations of misuse of power by Yengeni and Jacob Zuma. According to the Sunday Times, EADS admitted that the company "helped" approximately 30 South African officials to obtain luxury vehicles. Yengeni was specifically charged with defrauding parliament by accepting a discount on a luxury car during the tendering process for a controversial arms deal while he was the member of a parliamentary committee reporting on the same deal. Yengeni pleaded "not guilty" and placed full-page advertisements proclaiming his innocence in all the Sunday newspapers (except The Sunday Times). This was estimated to have cost the chief whip R250,000. Member of Parliament suggested that Yengeni was being offered up as a scapegoat for the arms deal scandal, so that others could avoid being charged.

Yengeni eventually entered into a plea agreement in which various corruption charges were dismissed in exchange for his pleading guilty to one count of fraud. In March 2003, the court entered a conviction against Yengeni for fraud and sentenced him to four years in prison. After failed appeals, Yengeni entered Pollsmoor Prison near Cape Town on 24 August 2006, was immediately transferred to more modern Malmesbury prison, but was released on parole on 15 January 2007 – after completing a mere four months of the four-year sentence.

In 2010, it came to light that Yengeni had failed, as required by the Companies Act, to inform the registration office of his fraud conviction, and had failed to remove himself as a director of registered companies. Yengeni was sued and had to withdraw as a director from six companies.

In 2013, additional documents came to light showing Yengeni's deeper involvement in the arms deal.

Drunk driving case
In November 2007 he was arrested for drunk driving in Goodwood, Cape Town. The case could not proceed because the blood sample was unfit to be taken for chemical analysis. This was because former Goodwood station commander, Siphiwo Hewana, allegedly gave an unknown person access to the blood sample.

Hewana was dismissed and put on trial for an attempt to defeat the ends of justice, incitement to commit perjury and interfering with the Yengeni investigation. Constable Charles Japhta alleged that Hewana told him he had instructions from Western Cape provincial police commissioner Mzwandile Petros to change statements on the docket relating to the time that Yengeni had been arrested. Hewana also said Yengeni's parole conditions had banned him from being out on the streets after 10pm, nor was he permitted to consume liquor, whereas Yengeni had been pulled off the road about midnight.

 Hewana testified that he had been ordered by the commissioner of police in the Western Cape to make the changes.
On 30 Nov 2009 Hewana was found guilty of attempting to defeat the ends of justice, but not guilty on conspiracy to commit perjury and interfering with police officials in the execution of their duties.

References

External links 

 
 

Living people
1954 births
Anti-apartheid activists
South African politicians convicted of fraud
African National Congress politicians
Corruption in South Africa
UMkhonto we Sizwe personnel